William Kenneth Cockcroft (born 12 May 1946 in Keighley, Yorkshire) is a former professional rugby league footballer who played in the 1960s and 1970s.

Early life

Cockcroft was born at 32 Park Grove in Lawkholme. He attended first Eastwood infants School and later Parkwood primary School. In an era when rugby players also needed a 'day job' on leaving school Cockroft trained as a Wool Sorter with J W Allen firstly on Airworth Road and later at Springfield  Mill on Oakworth Road. When the wool industry collapsed he took a job at Ondura working nights.

His rugby playing father Thomas Cockcroft introduced him to the game and started his career with Keighley Albion where he played on the wing. His try scoring ability earned him a call up in to the inter - league squad and Cockroft played along with four of his team mates for The Bradford League against the Halifax League at the end of the 1966 - 1967 season.

Keighley RLFC

Initially Keighley coach Harry Street approached Cockcroft to turn professional; when he was dismissed, new head coach Donald Metcalfe signed Billy on 23 November 1967 from local amateur side Keighley Albion, The same club that produced Terry Hollindrake, he signed for £850 and made his début two days later on 25 November 1967 in the home fixture to Huddersfield, which Keighley lost 2 - 26 Cockroft's only game of the 1967 - 1968 season. He went on to make 96 appearances for the club, playing his last game in the home fixture against Oldham on 5 September 1975, Keighley lost 8 - 17. Cockroft scored 25 tries's in his career

Memorable Games

Cockroft played for Keighley in the local derby game against Bradford Northern on 5 April 1969 in an 8 - 6 win for Keighley. Northern were seeking their 12 consecutive win before this game. Shortly after half time Keighley loose forward Bill Aspinall put winger Billy Cockroft away for a 60-yard dash for the line, rounding Bradford,s International fullback Terry Price to score a try converted by Brian Jefferson. Despite all Bradford Northern's efforts Keighley held on for a famous victory.

On Sunday 16 December 1973 in the 1973–74 Players No.6 Trophy Second Round match away to Wigan, Billy Cockcroft scored one of Keighley's two tries in Keighley's first ever win at Central Park. In an action packed game three players were sent off, Dave Wilmot and John Burke from Keighley and Wigan's Great Britain international  Colin Clarke.

Keighley's other scores were a try from centre Terry O'Brien and full back Brian Jefferson kicked four goals.

Relatives 
Cockcroft is son of the former Keighley RLFC  Thomas Cockcroft.

He is brother-in-law of the former rugby union prop, Frank Whitcombe Jr

He is uncle to the rugby union prop for England 'B' and Leicester Tigers, Martin Whitcombe.

References

100 Years of Lawkholme Lane by Trevor Delaney & John Pitchforth
Lawkholme Lane Galleries by Trevor Delaney & John Pitchforth
Keighley Albion 1948 - 1998. "Seasons to Remember" by Don & Dave Kirkley
 Whitcombe family archive

External links
 http://wigan.rlfans.com/news.php?readmore=2074   Keighley beat Wigan at Central Park

1946 births
Living people
English rugby league players
Keighley Cougars players
Rugby league wingers
Rugby league players from Keighley